Aplastodiscus ibirapitanga is a species of frog in the family Hylidae. Its natural habitats are subtropical or tropical moist lowland forests, subtropical or tropical moist montane forests, and rivers. It tolerates some habitat modification and is not considered threatened.

References

Aplastodiscus
Endemic fauna of Brazil
Amphibians of Brazil
Frogs of South America
Amphibians described in 2003